Mehmet Ekşi (born 1 April 1953) is a Turkish former international footballer and manager.

Style of play
Although his primary position is defender, Ekşi was often deployed in midfield. During his career, Ekşi possessed renown attributes of strength, stamina, timing and aerial capability.

Honours
Trabzonspor
Süper Lig: 1978–79
Turkish Cup: 1977–78, 1983–84
Turkish Super Cup: 1978

Beşiktaş
Süper Lig: 1981–82
TSYD Cup: 1984

Filmography

References

External links
Profile at Turkish Football Federation

1953 births
Living people
Association football midfielders
Association football defenders
Turkish footballers
Turkey international footballers
Süper Lig players
Beşiktaş J.K. footballers
Trabzonspor footballers
Elazığspor footballers
Antalyaspor footballers
Turkish football managers
Beşiktaş J.K. managers
Elazığspor managers
Kocaelispor managers
Sarıyer S.K. managers
People from Elazığ